Clarence Otto Kraft (June 9, 1887 – March 26, 1958) was an American Major League Baseball player. He went 1-for-3 at the plate with one strikeout.

His greater claims to fame came later, in the minor leagues. The first came immediately after his Major League career ended. The Braves had acquired Kraft from the Brooklyn Robins, and returned Kraft to them in July. Brooklyn tried to send Kraft to the minor leagues, but Kraft sought the protection of the newly-formed Fraternity of Professional Baseball Players of America, which under the terms of a new agreement with the Major League teams would allow Kraft to tender his services to higher-classed minor league teams. Under this clause, Kraft signed with the Class AA Newark Indians. However, the National Commission ruled that the rule could not be applied retroactively, and that Kraft's rights belonged to the Class A Nashville Volunteers. Kraft refused to report to the Volunteers, however, and the dispute was only settled when Robins owner Charles Ebbets paid Nashville $2,500 to rescind their claim on Kraft.

Later, playing for the Fort Worth Panthers, Kraft led the Texas League in home runs three straight times (–). In 1924, he hit 55 home runs and drove in 196 runs for the Panthers while batting .349. That season, he set several league records that stand to this day, including most runs scored (150), extra base hits (96), total bases (414) and runs batted in. Following the season, he announced his retirement and opened an auto dealership. He later served as a judge for Tarrant County before his death in 1958.

References

External links

1887 births
1958 deaths
Major League Baseball first basemen
Boston Braves players
McLeansboro Billikens players
McLeansboro Merchants players
Evansville River Rats players
Flint Vehicles players
Clarksdale Swamp Angels players
New Orleans Pelicans (baseball) players
Newark Indians players
Harrisburg Senators players
Milwaukee Brewers (minor league) players
Louisville Colonels (minor league) players
Wilkes-Barre Barons (baseball) players
Fort Worth Panthers players
Baseball players from Indiana
Sportspeople from Evansville, Indiana
County judges in Texas